Route 162 is a short 24 km highway on the south shore of the St. Lawrence River in Quebec, Canada, linking Autoroute 20 in Saint-Louis-de-Blandford and Victoriaville, at the junction of Route 122.

Municipalities along Route 162
 Victoriaville
 Saint-Rosaire
 Saint-Louis-de-Blandford

See also
 List of Quebec provincial highways

References

External links  
 Provincial Route Map (Courtesy of the Quebec Ministry of Transportation) 

162
Transport in Victoriaville